Spectrochimica Acta Part B: Atomic Spectroscopy is a monthly peer-reviewed scientific journal covering spectroscopy.

According to the Journal Citation Reports, the journal has a 2019 impact factor of 3.086. Currently, the editors-in-chief are M. T. C. de Loos-Vollebregt (Delft University of Technology) and A. De Giacomo (University of Bari).

The journal was established in 1939 as Spectrochimica Acta. In 1967, Spectrochimica Acta was split into two journals, Spectrochimica Acta Part A: Molecular and Biomolecular Spectroscopy and Spectrochimica Acta Part B: Atomic Spectroscopy. Part B obtained its current title around the time of the split.

References

External links 
 
 Spectroch. Acta B at CAS Source Index

Spectroscopy
Elsevier academic journals
Publications established in 1939
Chemistry journals
English-language journals
Journals published between 13 and 25 times per year